Bruce McNeil "Jackie" Beith (28 September 1893 – September 1961) was a rugby union player who represented Australia.

Beith, a fullback, was born in Mudgee, New South Wales and claimed a total of 4 international rugby caps for Australia.

References

                   

Australian rugby union players
Australia international rugby union players
1893 births
1961 deaths
Rugby union players from New South Wales
Rugby union fullbacks